Pawłowice may refer to the following places in Poland:
Pawłowice (palace)
Pawłowice, Lower Silesian Voivodeship, (south-west Poland)
Pawłowice, Łódź Voivodeship, (central Poland)
Pawłowice, Lublin Voivodeship, (east Poland)
Pawłowice, Jędrzejów County, in Świętokrzyskie Voivodeship (south-central Poland)
Pawłowice, Pińczów County, in Świętokrzyskie Voivodeship (south-central Poland)
Pawłowice, Grójec County, in Masovian Voivodeship (east-central Poland)
Pawłowice, Lipsko County, in Masovian Voivodeship (east-central Poland)
Pawłowice, Piaseczno County, in Masovian Voivodeship (east-central Poland)
Pawłowice, Sochaczew County, in Masovian Voivodeship (east-central Poland)
Pawłowice, Żyrardów County, in Masovian Voivodeship (east-central Poland)
Pawłowice, Jarocin County, in Greater Poland Voivodeship (west-central Poland)
Pawłowice, Leszno County, in Greater Poland Voivodeship (west-central Poland)
Pawłowice, Poznań County, in Greater Poland Voivodeship (west-central Poland)
Pawłowice, Gliwice County, in Silesian Voivodeship (south Poland)
Pawłowice, Pszczyna County, in Silesian Voivodeship (south Poland)
Pawłowice (Sokal Raion), in Sokal Raion (western Ukraine)
 Pawłowice Namysłowskie
 Pawłowice Wielkie